Planet Funk is an Italian electronic band. The group is composed of Marco Baroni, Domenico "GG" Calipari, Alex Neri, Dan Black and formerly Sergio Della Monica who died in February 2018. In addition a number of guest vocalists joined the group, including: Auli Kokko, Sally Doherty, Raiz, John Graham, Giuliano Sangiorgi and Alex Uhlmann.

History
Their first single, "Chase the Sun", reached number five on the UK Singles Chart in 2001. The melody is borrowed from Ennio Morricone's tune "Alla Luce Del Giorno", off the score of the 1969 film Metti, una sera a cena. The song has enjoyed a rise in popularity ever since Sky Sports began using it during its coverage of the Professional Darts Corporation's major tournaments. The crowds in the venues are encouraged to chant and rave to the song during the advert breaks of matches, and the song has a cult following amongst darts fans. The song is also known to be chanted by supporters at the games of Australian football clubs Newcastle Jets and Adelaide United, as well as being the second half opening theme for the English Football League Championship team, Sheffield Wednesday. English Championship Football team Reading also use the song for a goal song after they score a goal. Conference side Gateshead play this song at the end of a game, which results in a "Heed Heed Heed" chant along to the beat.  English Super League team Wigan Warriors are known to use the song following a successful drop-kick.   The Melbourne spring racing carnival used the song during promotional TV advertisements during the mid- to late 2000s. AFC Bournemouth also use the chant for the infamous striker Brett Pitman.

Their second single, "Inside All the People", reached no. 9 in the Italian singles charts, but did even better on the European dance charts. Their third single was "Who Said (Stuck In The UK)" which also gained significant commercial success.  Their 2007 single release, "Static", appeared on FIFA 08.

They are also remixers, with their highest-profile work to date being New Order's "Waiting for the Sirens' Call".

In May 2006 they became the first musical group to release a single exclusively as a mobile phone download, with the release of "Stop Me" on the mobile network 3.

In 2009 they released the single "Lemonade", which is featured on their album Planet Funk. The single "Weightless" was released in 2010, a collaboration between Planet Funk and Swedish artist Emilia de Poret.

Their album The Great Shake, featuring the vocalist & guitarist Alex Uhlmann, was released in September 2011; in the same month they opened the F1 Rocks concert at Monza during the Italian Grand Prix. The first single, "Another Sunrise" was released in Italy in May 2011.

In October 2015, they released the single "We-People", a song that supported the global campaign of Save the Children, to fight infant mortality.

"Chase the Sun" was chosen as the goal song of the Colorado Avalanche for the 2017–18 NHL season.

In February 2020, the band released the compilation album 20:20, followed by the remix album 20:20 Remixes in April 2020. The latter was published by Just Entertainment on YouTube and contains a list of remixes made by the band including remixes of unreleased songs "Any Given Day", "Catch the Break" and "I Can Change".

Discography

Albums

Singles

References 

Italian house music groups
Italian electronic rock musical groups